Khalil Tahmasebi (14 February 1924 – 1955) was a carpenter and member of the Iranian fundamentalist group Fadayan-e Islam ("Self-Sacrificers of Islam"), which has been described as "the first Shiite Islamist organization to employ terrorism as a primary method of political activism."  On behalf of this group, Tahmasebi assassinated the Iranian Prime Minister, Ali Razmara, on 7 March 1951. He was described as a "religious fanatic" by The New York Times.  In 1952, he was freed by the Iranian Parliament during the premiership of Mosaddegh, his pending death sentence was quashed, and he was declared a "Soldier of Islam."  According to Time, Tahmasebi "promptly rushed to the Hazrat Abdolazim shrine, wept joyously and said: 'When I killed Razmara, I was sure that his people would kill me.'"  Following the 1953 Iranian coup d'état, Tahmasebi was re-arrested and tried for the assassination of Razmara; he was executed in 1955.

References

Iranian assassins
Iranian Islamists
Shia Islamists
Assassins of heads of government
1924 births
1955 deaths
Executed assassins
People executed by Pahlavi Iran
Fada'iyan-e Islam members